Sabah People's Unity Party (abbreviated: PPRS) is a Sabah-based-opposition party founded in 2017 by Mohd Arshad Abdul Mualap, a little known former teacher turn businessman-politician from Sungai Sibuga, the power base of Sabah Chief Minister, Musa Aman then. It is one of parties in the alliance of United Sabah Alliance (USA).

Controversy
The president of Parti Perpaduan Rakyat Sabah identified as Mohd Arshad Abdul Mualap, 48, has been detained with another man – Mohamad Amkah Ahmad, 46, in Subang Jaya on 22 June 2022 and were charged in court for allegedly being the mastermind of an identification document scam syndicate.

“We believe the syndicate has been operating for at least a few months. They were selling invalid ICs for those without Malaysian citizenship,” Minister of Home Affairs Datuk Seri Hamzah Zainudin told a press conference in Bukit Aman.

General election results

See also
Politics of Malaysia
List of political parties in Malaysia

References 

Political parties in Sabah
Political parties with year of establishment missing